Philip Clifford (born 15 March 1979 in Bantry, County Cork) is an Irish former Gaelic footballer who played for his local club Bantry Blues, winning a Cork County championship in 1998, and was captain of the senior Cork county team from 1999 until 2005.

References

 

1973 births
Living people
All Stars Young Footballers of the Year
Bantry Blues Gaelic footballers
Cork inter-county Gaelic footballers
Drinking establishment owners
Munster inter-provincial Gaelic footballers
People from Bantry